John Winston Jones (November 22, 1791 – January 29, 1848) was an American politician and lawyer. He served five terms in the United States House of Representatives from 1835 to 1845. He served as Speaker of the House in both the U.S. House of Representatives (1843-1845) and the Virginia House of Delegates (1847).

Early life and career
Born November 22, 1791 in Amelia County, Virginia, he graduated from the College of William and Mary in 1813.  He practiced law in Chesterfield County, Virginia before being appointed Prosecuting Attorney for Virginia's 5th Judicial Circuit in 1818.  He was a delegate to the 1829–1830 state constitutional convention.

Tenure in Congress

Jones was elected as a Democrat to the United States House of Representatives in 1835 and served five terms. As he rose through the ranks of the House, he became chairman of the House Ways and Means Committee, replacing future president Millard Fillmore, and House Democratic Leader, succeeding future president James K. Polk.

He was elected to serve as Speaker of the House during the 28th Congress, which convened in 1843 and adjourned in 1845.

Jones declined nomination for a sixth term in Congress and returned to Virginia in 1845.

Career after Congress
Upon his retirement from Congress, he returned to the practice of law in Virginia. Among his more prominent cases, he served as lead counsel for Thomas Ritchie, Jr., who in 1846 faced trial for his involvement in the infamous duel in which John Hampden Pleasants was fatally wounded. Ritchie won acquittal on the grounds of self-defense.

That same year, Jones was elected to the Virginia House of Delegates and in 1847 was chosen as Speaker. He was elected to a second term in 1847, but did not attend the session due to illness. He resigned his seat on December 17. The vacant House seat was later filled by his son, Alexander.

Private life
Jones married Harriet Boisseau in 1815 and together they had three children: Mary Winston, James Boisseau and Alexander. His son-in-law was George W.B. Towns, who was the 39th Governor of Georgia from 1847 to 1851.

Jones died on January 29, 1848. He is buried in the family cemetery at his Dellwood Plantation northwest of Petersburg, Virginia.

Electoral history

1835; Jones was elected to the U.S. House of Representatives with 68.09% of the vote, defeating Whig William Segar Archer.
1837; Jones was re-elected unopposed.
1839; Jones was re-elected with 58.51% of the vote, defeating a Whig identified only as Taylor.
1841; Jones was re-elected with 69.47% of the vote, defeating Independents Junius E. Leigh and Thomas Miller.
1843; Jones was re-elected unopposed.

References

External links
Dellwood Plantation
Biography at the Biographical Directory of the United States Congress

1791 births
1848 deaths
College of William & Mary alumni
Speakers of the United States House of Representatives
Speakers of the Virginia House of Delegates
Virginia lawyers
Democratic Party members of the United States House of Representatives from Virginia
Jacksonian members of the United States House of Representatives from Virginia
19th-century American politicians
People from Amelia County, Virginia